Gheorghe Crețu (born 8 August 1968) is a Romanian professional volleyball coach and former player. He coached the Estonia national team from 2014 to 2019.

Honours

As a player
 National championships
 1991/1992  Romanian Championship, with Dinamo București
 1995/1996  Austrian Cup, with Hotvolleys Vienna
 1995/1996  Austrian Championship, with Hotvolleys Vienna
 1996/1997  Austrian Cup, with Hotvolleys Vienna
 1996/1997  Austrian Championship, with Hotvolleys Vienna

As a coach
 CEV Champions League
  2021/2022 – with ZAKSA Kędzierzyn-Koźle

 National championships
 2002/2003  Austrian Cup, with Hotvolleys Vienna
 2002/2003  Austrian Championship, with Hotvolleys Vienna
 2003/2004  Austrian Championship, with Hotvolleys Vienna
 2013/2014  Emir Cup, with Al Arabi Doha
 2019/2020  Russian SuperCup, with Kuzbass Kemerovo
 2021/2022  Polish Cup, with ZAKSA Kędzierzyn-Koźle
 2021/2022  Polish Championship, with ZAKSA Kędzierzyn-Koźle

Individual awards
 2017: Estonian Coach of the Year
 2018: Estonian Coach of the Year
 2022: CEV – Coach of the Year

References

External links

 
 Coach profile at LegaVolley.it   
 Coach profile at Volleybox.net

1968 births
Living people
Naturalised citizens of Austria
Sportspeople from Constanța
Romanian men's volleyball players
Romanian volleyball coaches
Volleyball coaches of international teams
Romanian expatriate sportspeople in Germany
Expatriate volleyball players in Germany
Romanian expatriate sportspeople in Austria
Expatriate volleyball players in Austria
Romanian expatriate sportspeople in Belgium
Romanian expatriate sportspeople in Italy
Romanian expatriate sportspeople in Poland
Romanian expatriate sportspeople in Qatar
Romanian expatriate sportspeople in Russia
Romanian expatriate sportspeople in Slovenia
AZS Olsztyn coaches
Cuprum Lubin coaches
Resovia (volleyball) coaches
ZAKSA Kędzierzyn-Koźle coaches